(born 6 August 1982) is a Japanese speed skater. He has competed for Japan at the 2010 Winter Olympics. He has also previously competed in the 2002 Winter Olympics. He won gold medal in the 2007 Asian Winter Games.

References 

1982 births
Japanese male speed skaters
Speed skaters at the 2002 Winter Olympics
Speed skaters at the 2010 Winter Olympics
Olympic speed skaters of Japan
Speed skaters at the 2003 Asian Winter Games
Speed skaters at the 2007 Asian Winter Games
Speed skaters at the 2011 Asian Winter Games
Medalists at the 2003 Asian Winter Games
Medalists at the 2007 Asian Winter Games
Medalists at the 2011 Asian Winter Games
Asian Games medalists in speed skating
Asian Games gold medalists for Japan
Asian Games silver medalists for Japan
Asian Games bronze medalists for Japan
Universiade medalists in speed skating
Living people
Universiade bronze medalists for Japan
Competitors at the 2005 Winter Universiade
20th-century Japanese people
21st-century Japanese people